Nuno Miguel Bico Alves Matos (born 3 July 1994) is a Portuguese former professional cyclist, who competed professionally between 2013 and 2019 for the , ,  and  teams. In August 2019, he was named in the startlist for the 2019 Vuelta a España.

Major results
2014
 5th Road race, National Under–23 Road Championships
2015
 1st  Road race, National Under–23 Road Championships
2016
 3rd Road race, National Under–23 Road Championships
 7th Overall Volta ao Alentejo
 7th Liège–Bastogne–Liège Espoirs

Grand Tour general classification results timeline

References

External links

1994 births
Living people
Portuguese male cyclists